James, Jim or Jimmy Short may refer to:

Sportspeople
 James Short (footballer) (1896–?), English footballer (Birmingham, Watford, Norwich City)
 Jimmy Short (1909–?), English footballer (Sheffield Wednesday, Brighton & Hove Albion, Barrow)
 James Short (rugby union) (born 1989), English rugby union player
 James Short (figure skater), coach and participant of the 1959 and 1960 United States Figure Skating Championships

Others
 James Short (mathematician) (1710–1768), Scottish mathematician, telescope, and scientific instrument maker
 Jim Short (politician) (born 1936), Australian politician and diplomat
 Jim Short (comedian) (born 1967), American stand-up comedian in San Francisco
 Jimmy Logan (James Allen Short, 1928–2001), Scottish actor
 James F. Short (1902–1986), American businessman, rancher, and politician
 James F. Short Jr. (1924–2018), American sociologist

See also